The Jose Rizal Memorial State University (JRMSU) is a state university in Zamboanga del Norte, Philippines.  It is mandated to provide higher professional, technical, special instructions for special purposes and promote research and extension services, advanced studies and progressive leadership in education, agriculture, arts and sciences, engineering and other fields. Its main campus is located in Dapitan. It became a university in 2010 by virtue of Republic Act 9852.

History
Jose Rizal Memorial State University was established by virtue of RA 9852 with Congresswoman Cecilia G. Jalosjos-Carreon as principal author, Congressman Cesar Jalosjos as co-author.  It was approved by President Gloria Macapagal Arroyo on December 15, 2009. It was formerly the Jose Rizal Memorial State College by virtue of Republic Act 8193 sponsored by Congressman Romeo G. Jalosjos of the 1st District of Zamboanga del Norte which was approved on June 11, 1996, by the President of the Republic, Fidel V. Ramos.

It was a consolidation of the Rizal Memorial Vocational School (RMNVS) in Dapitan, the Zamboanga del Norte School of Arts and Trades (ZNSAT) in Dipolog which was formed in 1961, and the Siocon National Vocational School (SNVS) in the municipality of Siocon, Zamboanga del Norte.

In 2002, two higher education institutions (HEIs) within Zamboanga del Norte, namely the Katipunan National Agricultural School (KNAS) in the municipality of Katipunan, Zamboanga del Norte and the Zamboanga del Norte Agricultural College (ZNAC) in the Municipality of Tampilisan, Zamboanga del Norte (which was then a part of the Western Mindanao State University system), were integrated into then JRMSC pursuant to CHED Memorandum Order No. 27 series of 2000 thus comprising the fourth and fifth campuses, respectively of JRMSU.

The first president was Dr. Felipe O. Ligan, who was appointed in 1997. On June 7, 2002, CHED Special Order No. 35, s. 2002 appointed Dr. Henry A. Sojor as the OIC President of the Jose Rizal Memorial State College in concurrent capacity as president of Central Visayas Polytechnic College in Dumaguete, now Negros Oriental State University.

In the span of two years and eight months, the board of trustees then deemed it best for the college to have its permanent leader.  Thus, on March 1, 2005, Dr. Edgar S. Balbuena assumed office as the second president of JRMSC pursuant to BOT Resolution No. 4, series of 2005 chaired by Fr. Rolando V. Rosa, OP.

With the appointment of Dr. Balbuena, the college charted a new course.  With his extraordinary leadership, it took only four years and nine months for the college to be elevated to the status of a university.  Indeed, the growth of the university means a continuing and growing commitment to academic excellence and quality, research, and productivity,  community involvement, and partnership for national development and global competitiveness.  Evidently, he emerged as a dynamo, leading the people of Zamboanga del Norte and adjacent provinces towards an improved quality life.

Campuses
 Main Campus: Dapitan, Zamboanga del Norte
 Dipolog, Zamboanga del Norte
 Katipunan, Zamboanga del Norte
 Tampilisan, Zamboanga del Norte
 Siocon, Zamboanga del Norte
 Sibuco, Zamboanga del Norte - External Studies Unit

Campus life
Jose Rizal Memorial State University Hymn (shortened as JRMSU Hymn) is the official hymn of the Jose Rizal Memorial State University . The hymn was composed by Wilfredo D. Carreon Jr., while its melody was arranged by Earl John Lapore.

References

Educational institutions established in 2010
2010 establishments in the Philippines
Universities and colleges in Zamboanga del Norte
State universities and colleges in the Philippines
Dapitan
Education in Dapitan